The 2007 All-Ireland Senior Ladies' Football Championship Final featured  and . Cork completed a three in a row of All-Ireland titles. Valerie Mulcahy scored 2–1 as Cork won 2–11 to 2–6. Mulcahy scored her first goal from the penalty spot just before half time. The decision to award the penalty was described as "questionable" and was only confirmed after the referee, Eugene O'Hare, consulted with his umpires. The penalty gave Cork a 1–6 to 0–3 half time lead. Cork were leading by 12 points when Cora Staunton and Fiona McHale scored two goals in the final minute, making the final score look more respectable for Mayo.

In addition to playing ladies Gaelic football, several members of the Mayo squad including Yvonne Byrne, Aoife Herbert and Cora Staunton, also played women's association football for the Mayo Ladies League XI that won the 2006 FAI Women's Cup and then represented the Republic of Ireland in the 2007–08 UEFA Women's Cup.

Match info

Teams

References

!
All-Ireland Senior Ladies' Football Championship Finals
All-Ireland
Cork county ladies' football team matches
Mayo county ladies' football team matches